Salvatore Masiello (born 31 January 1982) is an Italian former professional footballer who played as a left-back.

Club career

From Venezia to Palermo
Masiello started his career at Venezia, he made one Serie B appearances before moved to Lumezzane (Lega Pro Prima Divisione). In January 2003, he was signed by U.S. Città di Palermo, rejoined chairman Maurizio Zamparini. In 2004–05 season, he became a surplus of newly promoted Palermo, and he was loaned to Piacenza along with Simone Pepe. In 2005–06 season, he returned to Palermo, made his Serie A debut on 6 November 2005, against Sampdoria.

Udinese
In January 2006, he was involved in the transfer deal of David Di Michele, to join Udinese along with Pepe and Nicola Santoni in joint-ownership. Masiello's half registration rights was valued for €250,000 at that time. In the 2005–06 season, he played three Serie A games, two for Palermo and one for Udinese.

In 2006–07 season, he was loaned to Messina (Serie A) and 2007–08 for Vicenza (Serie B). In June 2008, Udinese acquired the whole rights for free.

Bari
In summer 2008, Masiello joined AS Bari from Udinese by joint-ownership bid, for €200,000. In June 2011 Bari acquired Masiello outright and sold Paulo Vitor Barreto back to Udinese.

Press reports in August 2011 stated that he was involved in a plate-throwing incident at a Bari team dinner. Fellow Bari player Alessandro Crescenzi was reportedly struck by the plate and had to have 40 stitches in the resulting wound. The club announced its intention to refer Masiello's conduct to the Court of Sports Arbitration of Lega Serie B and to seek termination of Masiello's contract.

Torino
On 31 January 2012, the last day of the transfer market, he moved to Torino, with whom he signed a contract until 2013. At the end of the season he was promoted to Serie A, playing only the last league game AlbinoLeffe - Torino (0–0).

The following season competed in the top division with the Granata, he totalled 24 appearances. He remained a free transfer at the end of the season, but on 8 July 2013 signed a new contract with the Granata. He followed the same fate the following year: left without a contract, he signed with Torino for another season.

International career
On 14 January 2004, when he played for Palermo, he was summoned from Italy under-21 Serie B representative team for an internship at the Borghesiana, not playing any games.

References

1982 births
Living people
Italian footballers
Association football fullbacks
Venezia F.C. players
F.C. Lumezzane V.G.Z. A.S.D. players
Palermo F.C. players
Piacenza Calcio 1919 players
Udinese Calcio players
A.C.R. Messina players
L.R. Vicenza players
S.S.C. Bari players
Torino F.C. players
Mantova 1911 players
Serie A players
Serie B players
Serie C players